The Maqam Echahid is a concrete monument commemorating the Algerian War. The monument was opened in 1982, on the 20th anniversary of Algeria's independence. It is fashioned in the shape of three standing palm leaves, which shelter the "Eternal Flame" under it. At the edge of each palm leaf is a statue of a soldier representing a stage of Algeria's struggle for independence.

Location 
The Martyrs Memorial is located on the heights of Algiers, in the municipality of El Madania, west of the Bois des arcades, east of Diar el Mahçoul and north of the plaza shopping center Riadh El Feth. It overlooks the neighborhood of Hamma (common Belouizdad) and Botanical Garden Hamma (known as Jardin d'essai) in the north. The monument has been erected on the site of an ancient military fort.

Description 

It rests on an esplanade that burns an "eternal flame" and includes a crypt, an amphitheater and the National Museum of El Mujahid (underground).

Construction 

The project to build a memorial in memory of the dead from the War of Independence is the brainchild of President Houari Boumedienne. Its implementation was, however, completed under the presidency of his successor Chadli Bendjedid.

The company Lavalin is responsible of the studies and construction of the monument. Several Algerian artists involved, like the painter Bashir Yelles, the calligrapher Abdelhamid Skander and the Polish sculptor Marian Konieczny.

The completion of the work was a real technological challenge because of the constraints inherent to the geometry of the assembly, especially the curvature of the fins, the situation of the site at the edge of a steep cliff and high seismicity of the region. Pierre Lamarre, director of engineering and structural design, Claude Naud, expert planning and construction methods, along with Bashir Yelles, imagined a solution that proved itself decisive and innovative.

Seven months (7 months and 20 day) (November 15, 1981 to July 5, 1982) were necessary to build this architectural work. The monument was inaugurated by the then President Chadli Bendjedid in February 1986.

Gallery

See also 
 Algerian war
 Azadi Tower
 Pearl square
 Memorial to the Liberation of Algeria

Notes 

Buildings and structures in Algiers
1982 sculptures
Martyrs' monuments and memorials
Towers completed in 1982
National monuments in Algeria
Tourist attractions in Algiers
1982 establishments in Algeria